Teutonic or Teuton(s) may refer to:

Peoples and cultures
 Teutons, a Germanic tribe or Celtic tribe mentioned by Greek and Roman authors
 Furor Teutonicus, a Latin phrase referring to the proverbial ferocity of the Teutons
 Having qualities related to classical Germanic peoples (dated)
 Pertaining to Germanic languages or speakers of those languages (dated) ; see Theodiscus 
 Having qualities related to modern Germans or Austrians (poetic)
 Nordic race, a putative sub-race discussed in the 19th to mid-20th centuries

Other uses
 A German Catholic order, the Teutonic Order
State of the Teutonic Order, the Northern European country it once formed
 Teutonic, West Virginia
 RMS Teutonic, a steam ship